Azemmour or Azammur is a Moroccan city, lying at the Atlantic ocean coast, on the left bank of the Oum Er-Rbia River, 75 km southwest of Casablanca.

Etymology 
The word Azemmour comes from the Berber word Azemmur ("wild olive tree").

History
Azemmour is generally identified as the Punic Azama, latinized as Asama.

Before 1486, it was a dependency of the King of Fez. In 1486 its inhabitants became vassals and tributaries of João II of Portugal.

In 1513 Azemmour's governor Moulay Zayam refused to pay the tribute and mustered a powerful, well-equipped army. Manuel responded to this challenge by sending a massive fleet of 500 ships and 15 thousand soldiers (Bergreen, 19).  James, Duke of Braganza led this army and on  September 1st  he conquered the city with no resistance from its inhabitants. Ferdinand Magellan, the man famed for leading the first-ever circumnavigation of the earth, was among the Portuguese soldiers there; he lost his horse in skirmishes outside the city. Portuguese control of the city lasted only for a short period; it was abandoned by João III of Portugal in 1541 due to his court's economic difficulties.

Geography

Azemmour's beach is a place for surfing and kitesurfing. Also called Haouzia, the area's flora includes eucalyptus and pine.

Culture
A spring festival used to be held annually in Azemmour in March. It was first held in 2007. The patron saint of Azemmour is Abu Shuayb. His mausoleum was built on the order of Mohammed ben Abdallah. Each year, a moussem is celebrated to honour him. The Old City's walls are decorated by several local artists. The city features a Portuguese medina, which has three parts, a Jewish mellah, a kasbah, and the old medina.

Notable natives or residents

Jaafar Aksikas, Moroccan American author and intellectual 
Estevanico, also known as Esteban the Moor, was enslaved and traveled with a Spanish expedition to North America in 1527. He is the first African to travel with explorers in North America and was one of four men out of several hundred to survive shipwrecks on the Florida and Texas coasts, Native American slavery and attacks, and other setbacks over a six-year period before he and his party reached safety in a Spanish colonial town.
Abdallah Laroui, Moroccan historian, novelist and philosopher

Images

See also
 Battle of Azemmour

References

Citations

Bibliography
 .
 . 

Former Portuguese colonies
Kingdom of the Algarve
Populated places in El Jadida Province
Phoenician colonies in Morocco